Weza may refer to:

Węża, a village in Poland
Weza, South Africa